James Morris (14 September 1896 – 18 March 1932) was an Irish hurler. Usually lining out at midfield, he was a member of the Galway team that won the 1923 All-Ireland Championship.

Morris enjoyed a club career with Gort that spanned three decades. After joining the club's senior team in his late teens, he won two county championship medals in 1914 and 1916. He later served as captain of the team for over a decade.

After being selected for the Galway senior team in 1922, he won a Connacht medal in his debut championship. He won his sole All-Ireland medal in 1923 after Galway's defeat of Limerick in the final.

Morris died of tuberculosis on 18 March 1932. He was the first member of Galway's inaugural All-Ireland-winning team to die.

Honours

Gort
Galway Senior Hurling Championship (2): 1914, 1916

Galway
All-Ireland Senior Hurling Championship (1): 1923
Connacht Senior Hurling Championship (1): 1922

References

1896 births
1932 deaths
Gort hurlers
Galway inter-county hurlers
All-Ireland Senior Hurling Championship winners
20th-century deaths from tuberculosis
Tuberculosis deaths in Ireland